Oscar Zárate (born 1942) is an Argentine comic book artist and illustrator. Zarate studied architecture and had a successful career in advertising in Argentina. He moved to Europe in 1971 and began to work in earnest as an illustrator. He has drawn for the UK comics magazine Crisis. In the Introducing... and ...For Beginners book series he illustrated texts written by  Richard Appignanesi, Alexei Sayle, Dylan Evans, J P McEvoy, Angus Gellatly, Rupert Woodfin and Christopher Marlowe. He is perhaps best known in the United States as the artist for the graphic novel A Small Killing written by Alan Moore, one-shot story about a once idealistic advertising executive haunted by his boyhood self.

Bibliography 
As artist, unless otherwise noted
 Lenin for Beginners (Writers and Readers, 1977) — written by Richard Appignanesi
 Freud for Beginners (Writers and Readers, 1979) — written by Richard Appignanesi
 William Shakespeare's Othello (Ravette, 1983)
 Dr Faustus (World Theatre Classics) (Abacus, 1986) - written by Christopher Marlowe
 Geoffrey the Tube Train and the Fat Comedian (Methuen, 1987)  — written by  Alexei Sayle
 A Small Killing (VG Graphics, 1991) — written by Alan Moore
 Stephen Hawking for Beginners (Icon Books, 1995) — written by J.P. McEvoy
 Quantum Theory for Beginners (Icon Books, 1996) — written by J.P. McEvoy
 Mind & Brain for Beginners (Icon Books, 1998) — written by Angus Gellatly
 Introducing Evolutionary Psychology (Icon Books, 1999) — written by Dylan Evans
 Introducing Existentialism (Icon Books, 2001) — written by Richard Appignanesi
 Introducing Marxism (Icon Books, 2004) — written by Rupert Woodfin

External links
Oscar Zarate at the Comiclopedia

1942 births
Argentine comics artists
Living people